Frink is an unincorporated community in Calhoun County, Florida, United States. It is located on State Road 73.

Geography

References

Unincorporated communities in Calhoun County, Florida
Unincorporated communities in Florida